Daphne sericea is a shrubby species of flowering plant in the genus Daphne with purple flowers. It was described by Martin Vahl. Daphne collina has been treated as a separate species, but is considered to be a cultivar or group of cultivars of D. sericea.

Description
Daphne sericea usually grows as a shrub to a height of 30 to 40 cm, but can sometimes grow taller. Its leaves are 2 to 4 cm in length. Fragrant purple flowers are produced in late spring to early summer in clusters of 5 to 15. Each flower is around 8 mm long. Fertilized flowers produce fleshy fruits, orange-red to orange-brown in colour. Forms from southern Italy have been called Daphne collina, Daphne sericea 'Collina' and Daphne sericea Collina Group. They are more compact than forms from other parts of the species' range, but otherwise similar.

Distribution and habitat
Daphne sericea is found in southern Italy, Sicily, Crete, Syria and the Caucasus. It typically grows on rocky slopes and in open pinewoods, at elevations up to 1800 m.

Subspecies
Three subspecies are recognized:
Daphne sericea subsp. sericea – includes D. sericea 'Collina'; up to 1 m tall; found around the Mediterranean
Daphne sericea subsp. circassica (Woronow ex Pobed.) Halda – shorter, with a longer flower tube; from the west Caucasus
Daphne sericea subsp. pseudosericea (Pobed.) Halda – similar to subsp. circassica, but with larger flowers and less visible anthers; from the west Transcaucasus

References

sericea
Taxa named by Martin Vahl